Ursula "Ulla" Jelpke (born 9 June 1951) is a German journalist and politician. Jelpke is a member of the German Bundestag where she is domestic affairs spokesperson for the party Die Linke and represents the party in the internal affairs committee and the legal affairs committee.

As a trained hairdresser and book seller, Jelpke later acquired a high school diploma and studied sociology and economics. From 2002 until 2005 she headed the domestic affairs desk at the newspaper Junge Welt in Berlin. Since 2003 she has been co-editor of the magazine Ossietzky.

Jelpke was a member of the Hamburg Bürgerschaft for the Green-Alternative List twice between 1981 and 1989. Starting from 1990, she has been a member of the 12th–14th, 16th and 17th German Bundestags respectively.

In November 2020, Jelpke announced that she would not seek reelection in the 2021 German federal election.

References

External links
Personal homepage (German)
Bundestag homepage (German)

1951 births
German journalists
German editors
German women journalists
German women editors
Members of the Bundestag for North Rhine-Westphalia
Members of the Hamburg Parliament
Alliance 90/The Greens politicians
Living people
Female members of the Bundestag
21st-century German women politicians
Members of the Bundestag 2017–2021
Members of the Bundestag 2013–2017
Members of the Bundestag 2005–2009
Members of the Bundestag 1998–2002
Members of the Bundestag 1994–1998
Members of the Bundestag for The Left
20th-century German women